Glen is a neighborhood in Baltimore, Maryland. It was developed in the early 1920s and 1930s, with the remaining development coming in the 1940s through the 1960s.  Glen is one of the largest communities of Northern Park Heights in Baltimore. Glen is a neighborhood of mixed housing types that include Tudor, French Norman and brick ranch houses, along with garden apartments, condominiums and semi-detached single family homes.

The neighborhood, and its notable coexistence of African Americans and Orthodox Jews, have at least twice been featured in The Baltimore Sun: April 29, 2001, and May 13, 2004.

The neighborhood's motto is "Glen is a Great Place to Live".

Glen Neighborhood Improvement Association
The Glen Neighborhood Improvement Association (GNIA) was formed in the late 1960s. Howard Moore and Jackie Miller were two of the early presidents. Min Hoffspiegel, Delores Brown and Iris Smith have also served as presidents.

On February 16, 1999, the organization was incorporated under the laws of the State of Maryland.  With the help of the University of Maryland, Baltimore School Of Law, Clinical Law Office, the Glen Neighborhood Improvement Association, Inc obtained tax-exempt status (501c3) in November, 1999.

The GNIA has developed relationships with community groups such as CHAI, the Northwest Citizen’s on Patrol, the Northwestern Police District, Baltimore City officials, State officials and the presidents of community associations form Falstaff, Cheswolde, Cross Country, and Mount Washington.  Glen worked with the neighborhoods mentioned on the Strategic Neighborhood Action Plan (SNAP).

Glen helped to host the inaugural International Diversity Celebration Music Festival at Pimlico Middle School on September 12, 2004. Mayor Martin O’Malley addressed the festival attendees.

See also
 List of Baltimore neighborhoods

External links 
Glen Neighborhood Improvement Association
 Northwest District Maps

 
African-American history in Baltimore
Jews and Judaism in Baltimore
Neighborhoods in Baltimore
Orthodox Jewish communities
Orthodox Judaism in Baltimore